Alison Anne Motsinger-Reif is an American biostatistician and human geneticist specialized in association analyses, big data, and genomic analyses. In December 2018, she became the chief of the biostatistics and computational biology branch at the National Institute of Environmental Health Sciences. Montsinger-Reif was previously a professor of statistics at the North Carolina State University.

Life 
Motsinger-Reif was a lab technician in the department of physiology and pharmacology at Wake Forest University from 1997 to 2000. Her advisor was James E. Smith. She earned a B.S. in Biological Sciences (2002), M.S. in Applied Statistics (2006) and Ph.D. in Human Genetics (2007) at Vanderbilt University.

She held varying faculty roles at North Carolina State University from 2007 to 2018 including professor of statistics and biostatistics core director. On December 10, 2018, she joined National Institute of Environmental Health Sciences (NIEHS) as chief of the Biostatistics & Computational Biology Branch. Her group focuses on the development and application of modern statistical approaches for understanding the etiology of common, complex diseases. She conducts association analyses looking at large-scale genetics and genomics data to find genetic factors that predict complex disease, and responses to drugs and environmental chemicals.

References 

Living people
Year of birth missing (living people)
Place of birth missing (living people)
21st-century American women scientists
21st-century American biologists
National Institutes of Health people
Vanderbilt University alumni
North Carolina State University faculty
Wake Forest University people
21st-century American mathematicians
American women statisticians
American women geneticists
American geneticists
Biostatisticians
Human geneticists
Statistical geneticists